Innisfree is a 1990 Spanish documentary film directed by José Luis Guerín. It was screened in the Un Certain Regard section at the 1990 Cannes Film Festival. The film revisits Cong, a small town in the west of Ireland, famous as the location of the 1952 John Ford film The Quiet Man.

Cast
 Bartley O'Feeney as himself
 Padraig O'Feeney as himself
 Anna Livia Ryan as herself
 Anne Slattery as Maureen O'Hara

References

External links

1990 films
Spanish documentary films
English-language Spanish films
English-language Irish films
Irish-language films
Films directed by José Luis Guerín
Documentary films about films
1990 documentary films
1990s Spanish films